The 2001 Arizona State Sun Devils football team represented Arizona State University during the 2001 NCAA Division I-A football season. They were coached by Dirk Koetter.

Schedule

Game summaries

Oregon State

    
    
    
    
    
    
    
    
    
    
    

Delvon Flowers 23 Rush, 226 Yds (sixth highest in school history)

Roster

References

Arizona State
Arizona State Sun Devils football seasons
Arizona State Sun Devils football